Los Millares is a Chalcolithic occupation site 17 km north of Almería, in the municipality of Santa Fe de Mondújar, Andalucía, Spain. The complex was in use from the end of the fourth millennium (c. 3000 BC) to the end of the third millennium BC (2000 BC) and probably supported somewhere around 1000 people. It was discovered in 1891 during the construction of a railway. It was first excavated by Luis Siret in the succeeding years. Excavations are ongoing.

Site description
The road to the site is guarded by four smaller outlying stone forts. There is an extensive cemetery of eighty passage grave tombs. Radiocarbon dating has established that one wall collapsed and was rebuilt around 3025 BC.

A cluster of simple dwellings lay inside the walls as well as one large building containing evidence of copper smelting. Pottery excavated from the site included plain and decorated wares including symbolkeramik bowls bearing oculus motifs. Similar designs appear on various carved stone idols found at the site. Although primarily farmers, the inhabitants of Los Millares had crucially also learned metal working, especially the smelting and forming of copper, and the site is considered highly important in understanding the transition from the Neolithic to the Bronze Age. The Los Millares culture eventually came to dominate the Iberian peninsula.

The population of Los Millares has been estimated at approximately 1000 in the timeframe 3200–2300 BC.
The labor involved in its construction, the large volume of stones used, its geometric characteristics and sophisticated design all indicate multiple functionality, including defense and power.

Relationship to other prehistoric cultures
Los Millares participated in the continental trends of Megalithism and the Beaker culture . Analysis of occupation material and grave goods from the Los Millares cemetery of 70 tholos tombs with port-hole slabs has led archaeologists to suggest that the people who lived at Los Millares were part of a stratified, unequal society which was often at war with its neighbors . The Los Millares civilisation was replaced circa 1800 BC, with the arrival of Bronze by the El Argar civilisation, whose successor culture is embodied in the contemporary culture of Vila Nova de São Pedro in nearby Portugal.

Similarities between Los Millares architecture and the step pyramid at Monte d'Accoddi in Sardinia have been noticed .

Conservation and access
The site has been protected by a heritage designation, currently Bien de Interés Cultural, since 1931.

There is an interpretation centre at the site itself.
Some finds are displayed at the National Archaeological Museum in Madrid, and others at the Museum of Almería.

Gallery

See also
 Prehistoric Europe
 Chalcolithic Europe
 Megalith, including other European megalithic cultures

References

External links

 Virtual visit to the archaeological place of Los Millares

Archaeological cultures of Southwestern Europe
Chalcolithic cultures of Europe
Archaeological cultures in Spain
Archaeological sites in Andalusia
Prehistoric sites in Spain
Buildings and structures in Andalusia
Indigenous ancient cities in Spain
Bien de Interés Cultural landmarks in the Province of Almería